Gould Farm is an unincorporated community in Caldwell County, in the U.S. state of Missouri.

History
A post office called Gould Farm was established in 1876, and remained in operation until 1905. The community was named for C. L. Gould, the original owner of the town site.

References

Unincorporated communities in Caldwell County, Missouri
1876 establishments in Missouri
Unincorporated communities in Missouri